Ərtəpə (known as Novogorelovka until 1991) is a village and municipality in the Gadabay Rayon of Azerbaijan.  It has a population of 1,487.  The municipality consists of the villages of Ərtəpə, Pirbulaq, and Soyuqbulaq.

References

External links
 

Populated places in Gadabay District